Sheena Easton is a Scottish recording artist with a discography that consists of 15 studio albums and 15 compilation albums. Easton released her debut album, Take My Time, in 1980, and the single "Morning Train – (9 to 5)" reached number 12 on the Billboard Year-End Hot 100 in 1981. She continued to chart in the US until 1991.
Easton garnered 5 US Gold albums and 1 Platinum album with 7 gold singles and has 20 US top 40 singles and 7 US top tens. She scored one US No. 1 on the Billboard Hot 100 between 1981 and 1991.

Albums

Studio albums

Compilation albums

Singles

Other album, soundtrack, film/song performances
 "Have You Heard the Rumour?", Un-released track from "Take My Time" (1981)
 "For Your Eyes Only" - from the James Bond film and OST For Your Eyes Only (1981)
 "Help is on its Way", "Fooled Around and Fell in Love", "Star", "Raised on Robbery" from "Sheena Easton, Live at the Palace, Hollywood" - (1982), re-released as a Deluxe Edition in 2022. "Star" not released until 2022 edition
 "Wish You Were Here Tonight", released as Non Album B-side of the single "Telefone" [Long Distance Love Affair] (1983)
 "Have You Ever Been In Love", Un-released track from "A Private Heaven" (1984)
 "Strut" - from the film Protocol (1984) 
 "It's Christmas All Over the World" - from the film and OST Santa Claus: The Movie (1985)
 "So Far, So Good" and "Natural Love" - from the film and OST About Last Night... (1986) 
 "Anything Can Happen" Un-released track from "No Sound But a Heart" (1987)
 "Sweet Talker" Un-released track from "No Sound But a Heart" (1987)
 "Rhythm of Romance" Un-released track from "No Sound But a Heart" (1987)
 "Shockwave" released as Non Album B-side of the single "Eternity" (1987)
 "U Got the Look" - duet with Prince on his album and film Sign O' The Times (1987)
 "Jaguar" - Un-released track. Initially intended for a full album produced by "Prince" recorded at Sunset Sound. (Jan, 1987)
 "Come Back 2 Me" - Un-released track. Recorded at Paisley Park, Sept 29, (1988)
 "Follow My Rainbow" - from the Miami Vice III OST (1988)
 "Sheena Easton appears in Bally's Total Fitness commercials from (1988-1990)
 "Ice Out In The Rain- (Remix) from "For Your Eyes Only: The Best of Sheena Easton" U.K. (1989) 
 "The Arms of Orion" - duet with Prince from the Batman  Warner Brothers soundtrack album (1989)
 "What Comes Naturally" - from the film OST The Taking of Beverly Hills (1991)
 "Voices that Care" Choir member (1991) 
 "A Dream Worth Keeping" - from the animated film and OST FernGully: The Last Rainforest (1992)
 "Modern Girl" (Live in San Diego) Bootleg (1992) concert from World Wide Tour 1983.
 "The Nearness of You" - from the film and OST Indecent Proposal (1993) 
 "Is There Anyone" duet with Julian Lennon - from David Copperfield (1993)
 "Family Christmas" - from "David Copperfield" (1993) 
 "I Only Think of You" Patrice Rushen - from Anything But Ordinary  (Background vocals) (1994)
 "For Your Eyes Only" (live version) - from Grammy's Greatest Moments Volume IV (1994)
 "Now and Forever" duet with Barry Manilow - from OST The Pebble and the Penguin (1995)
 "Sentimental Journey" - from Swing Alive! at the Hollywood Palladium (1996)
 "Are There Angels?" - from the OST Shiloh (1996) 
 "Count Me Out", "I Will Always Be With You" - from the OST and film All Dogs Go to Heaven 2 (1996) 
 "The Place Where We Belong" duet with Jeffrey Osborne and "The Lord's Prayer" - from The Colors Of Christmas (1998)
 "Goodnight & I Love You" duet with Jeffrey Osborne- from "Barney's Great Adventure- The Movie" (1998)
 "Carry a Dream" - from OST Marco: Haha wo Tazunete Sanzen Ri Japanese, (1999), feature-length remake of 1976 Nippon Animation anime television series) 
 "If You're Happy" - from Cover-Morning Musume-Hello Project (2002)
 "Morning Train (9 to 5)" - from the film EuroTrip (2004)
 "Love Is In Control" - from Love to Love you Baby! A Tribute to Donna Summer (2005)
 "What You Are" - from Lost Odyssey, An original RPG exclusive to the Xbox 360 (2007)
 "Eclipse of time" - from Lost Odyssey, an original RPG exclusive to the Xbox 360 (2007)
 "Strut"- from the film and OST Dirty Girl (2010)
 "Happy Evil Love Song" and "When Will He Call Me" from the OST Phineas and Ferb: Across the 1st and 2nd Dimensions (2011)
 "Shadow Waltz, You're Getting to Be a Habit with Me, I Only Have Eyes for You, Boulevard of Broken Dreams, About A Quarter to Nine, 42nd St. Original London Cast Sound Recording, (2017)
 "Strut" - from the Amazon Streaming TV Series "Red Oaks" Season One (2014-2017)
 "Sugar Walls"- from FX Pose Season 1, Episode 4 "The Fever" (2018)

Songwriting
"Moody (My Love)" – 1981, written by Sheena Easton and Christopher Neil
"Straight Talking" – 1984, written by S. Easton, G. Mathieson, T. Veitch, A. Loboriel
"Shockwave" – 1987, written by Sheena Easton, Narada Michael Walden, and Jesse Johnson
"La, La, La, He, He, Hee" – 1987, written by Sheena Easton and Prince
"Love '89" – 1989, written by Sheena Easton and Prince
"The Arms of Orion" – 1989, written by Sheena Easton and Prince (US #36 UK#27)
"The First Touch of Love" – 1991, written by Sheena Easton and Ian Prince
"Half a Heart" – 1991, written by Sheena Easton, Oliver Leiber, and Derek Bramble
"The Next Time" – 1991, written by Sheena Easton and David Frank
"The Miracle of Love" – 1993, written by Sheena Easton and Chika Ueda
"Flower in the Rain" – 1995, written by Sheena Easton, Arnie Roman, and Tina Shafer
"Love Will Make You Wise" – 1997, written by Sheena Easton and Cliff Magness
"One Man" – 1997, written by Sheena Easton, Carol Bayer Sager, and Cliff Magness

Music videos

Video and live compilations
Sheena Easton, Live at the Palace, Hollywood (1982, US), Re-released on DVD/CD boxset (2022).
Sony Video 45 (1983, US)
Sheena Easton: Act 1 television special (1983, US)
Sony Video 45 (1984, US)
For Your Eyes Only: The Best of Sheena Easton (1989, UK)
Star Portrait: Sheena Easton (1989, UK)
Sheena Easton: 7 Minute Stomach workout video (1993, US)
Sheena Easton: Body Blade Workout promo (1994, US)
Sheena Easton: Pop Princesses documentary (2000, UK)
Sheena Easton: Never Can Say Goodbye documentary (2000, UK)

Concert tours and Vegas residencies
 Sheena Easton "World Tour" 1982
 A Private Heaven Tour 1984
 No Sound But a Heart Tour 1987
 Sheena Easton "World Tour" 1989
 Japan "Greatest Hits" Tour 1995
 The Colors of Christmas Tour 1997-1998 - 2001 & 2003
 "At the Copa" with David Cassidy, Rio Hotel 2000-2001
 Sheena Easton "For Your Ears Only" Las Vegas Hilton 2002-2003
 The Sheena Easton Show, South Point Casino Las Vegas, 2013-2014
 Australia "Greatest Hits" Tour 2015
 Sheena Easton "The Spy Who Loved Me" symphony concerts 2015-2016
 Sheena Easton "Reimagined New York State Fair concert" - 2021

Notes

References

Discographies of British artists
Pop music discographies
Rhythm and blues discographies